The women's team tennis event was part of the tennis programme and took place between October 2 and 5, at the Geumjeong Tennis Stadium.

Indonesia won the gold medal.

Schedule
All times are Korea Standard Time (UTC+09:00)

Results

1st round

Quarterfinals

Semifinals

Final

Non-participating athletes

References 

2002 Asian Games Official Reports, Page 741

External links 
Official Website

Tennis at the 2002 Asian Games